O Say Can You See and similar phrases could refer to:

"O Say Can You See", the incipit of the national anthem of the United States, "The Star-Spangled Banner"
"Oh Say Can You See", a song from the 2010 album Lana Del Ray by Lana Del Rey
Oh, Say, Can You See? The Semiotics of the Military in Hawaii, a 1995 book by political scientists Kathy Ferguson and Phyllis Turnbull